In enzymology, a glucoside 3-dehydrogenase is an enzyme that catalyzes the chemical reaction

sucrose + acceptor  3-dehydro-alpha-D-glucosyl-beta-D-fructofuranoside + reduced acceptor

Thus, the two substrates of this enzyme are sucrose and acceptor, whereas its two products are 3-dehydro-alpha-D-glucosyl-beta-D-fructofuranoside and reduced acceptor.

This enzyme participates in galactose metabolism and starch and sucrose metabolism. It employs one cofactor, FAD.

Nomenclature 

This enzyme belongs to the family of oxidoreductases, specifically those acting on the CH-OH group of donor with other acceptors. The systematic name of this enzyme class is D-aldohexoside:acceptor 3-oxidoreductase. Other names in common use include D-glucoside 3-dehydrogenase, D-aldohexopyranoside dehydrogenase, D-aldohexoside:cytochrome c oxidoreductase, D-glucoside 3-dehydrogenase, hexopyranoside-cytochrome c oxidoreductase, and D-aldohexoside:(acceptor) 3-oxidoreductase.

References 

 

EC 1.1.99
Flavoproteins
Enzymes of unknown structure